The 1938 Washington State Cougars football team was an American football team that represented Washington State College in the Pacific Coast Conference (PCC) during the 1938 college football season. Thirteenth-year head coach Babe Hollingbery led the team to a 2–8 record (1–7 in PCC, ninth); they were outscored 159 to 44 and held scoreless four times.

The Cougars' three home games were played on campus at Rogers Field in Pullman, with a road game in nearby Moscow against Palouse rival Idaho, played in the snow.

Schedule

References

External links
 Game program: Oregon at WSC – September 24, 1938
 Game program: California at WSC – October 1, 1938
 Game program: UCLA at WSC – November 5, 1938

Washington State
Washington State Cougars football seasons
Washington State Cougars football